Dawid Szwedzki (born 18 April 1994) is a Polish swimmer. He competed in the men's 200 metre individual medley event at the 2017 World Aquatics Championships.

References

External links
 

1994 births
Living people
Polish male medley swimmers
Place of birth missing (living people)
21st-century Polish people